Tina Satchwell (née Dingivan; born 30 November 1972) is an Irish woman who went missing under suspicious circumstances on 20 March 2017.

Background
Satchwell is from St Bernard's Place in Fermoy, County Cork. She lived with her husband of 25 years, Richard Satchwell, and their two dogs on Grattan Street in the seaside town of Youghal.

Disappearance
Satchwell disappeared from her home on 20 March 2017. She was last seen in public at a car boot sale with her husband in the town of Carrigtwohill on 19 March 2017. Richard was the last person to see her, reportedly at 10 am on 20 March 2017. He stated that Tina asked him to go to an Aldi store in Dungarvan to buy fish, and that she was gone by the time he returned around noon. He reported her missing on 24 March 2017. She was aged 45 at the time of her disappearance.

Richard stated that his wife had been depressed and was troubled by family disputes. He believed that she had chosen to leave "to get her head straight". He later suggested that she may have gone to live with family in the United Kingdom with the help of a third party; however, Tina's family have rejected this idea. Gardaí (Irish police) have stated that Tina did not pass through any Irish or UK port or airport and that they believe she did not leave Ireland. She did not own a passport and did not take any identification with her. Richard stated that he believed she had taken €26,000 in cash, the proceeds of the sale of a house. Two suitcases were missing from the house. Her phone has not been used, and her bank account has not been accessed since the day of her disappearance.

In June 2017, Richard appeared alongside Tina's aunt, Margaret Maher, on the RTÉ show Crimecall to make a public appeal for information. The following month, in response to media attention and social media speculation, he stated that he would be willing to take a lie detector test. He later declined to take a test during an interview on Cork's Red FM. In January 2018, RTÉ aired a Prime Time special programme on Tina's disappearance, featuring Richard, Tina's cousin Sarah Howard, and gardaí involved in the case. In 2018, Richard appeared on The Ray D'Arcy Show to discuss Tina's disappearance.

In March 2018, an Garda Síochána carried out a search in Mitchel's Wood near Castlemartyr in County Cork, 20 minutes from Youghal. The operation was based on a tip from a member of the public who claimed to have seen someone leave the woods on the night of Satchwell's disappearance. A no-fly zone was established over the area. Despite an extensive search, which included the use of detection dogs, no trace of Satchwell was found. Searches were also carried out in scrubland and off the quays in Youghal, but nothing was discovered. Gardaí have also engaged with Interpol.

See also
List of people who disappeared

References

1972 births
2010s missing person cases
Missing people
Missing person cases in Ireland
Unsolved crimes in Ireland